David Huerta (8 October 1949 – 3 October 2022) was a Mexican poet and the son of well-known poet Efraín Huerta. His wife was the writer Verónica Murguía.

Biography 

He was born in Mexico City, the son of the poets Efraín Huerta and Mireya Bravo Munguía, and was immersed from childhood in Mexico's literary environment. He studied Philosophy, and English and Spanish literature at the National Autonomous University of Mexico (UNAM). There he met Rubén Bonifaz Nuño and Jesús Arellano, who published his first book of poems, The Garden of Light.

Huerta spent many years translating and editing for the Fondo de Cultura Económica, an institution where he directed the magazine La Gaceta del FCE. In addition to his poetry and essays, he wrote an opinion column in the political weekly Proceso. He opposed cuts to the cultural budget by the Mexican government, struggling in particular to preserve the home of the poet Ramón López Velarde (whose library is named after Huerta's father), which has often been threatened by a shortage of resources.

He received numerous awards, most notably the Carlos Pellicer poetry award in 1990 and the Xavier Villaurrutia Prize in 2006. He was a Fellow of the Mexican Writers' Centre (1970-1971), the Guggenheim Foundation (1978-1979), and the Fund for Culture and the Arts (FONCA). Since 1993, he has been a part of the National System of Creators of Art.

His advocacy of literature and poetry was extensive as a coordinator of literary workshops in the Casa del Lago of UNAM, INBA, and Institute for Social Security and Services for State Workers. He was also a teacher of literature at the Octavio Paz Foundation and the Foundation of Mexican Letters.

Of himself as a poet, Huerta said: 

Huerta died of kidney failure on 3 October 2022.

Works 
The Garden of Light (UNAM, 1972)
Notebook November (Era, 1976; Conaculta 1992)
Footprints of the civilized (the typewriter, 1977)
Version (Fondo de Cultura Económica, 1978 Era, 2005))
The Mirror of the body (UNAM, 1980)
Incurable (Era, 1987)
History (Ediciones Toledo, 1990)
The objects are closer than they appear (1990)
The Shadow of the Dog (Aldus, 1996) 
The music of what happens (Conaculta, 1997) 
To the surface (Filodecaballos, 2002) 
The blue flame (Era, 2002) 
The White Street (Era, 2006) 
Translations by the Poetry Translation Centre.

See also 
 Mexican literature 
 Efraín Huerta 
 Fondo de Cultura Económica 
 Xavier Villaurrutia

References

External links 
 David Huerta Poems 
 

1949 births
2022 deaths
Writers from Mexico City
Mexican male poets
Mexican publishers (people)
National Prize for Arts and Sciences (Mexico)
20th-century Mexican poets
20th-century Mexican male writers
21st-century Mexican poets
21st-century Mexican male writers
Deaths from kidney failure